Herbert "Bill, Herbie" Deskins, Jr. (born November 26, 1943) was an American politician in the state of Kentucky. He served in the Kentucky House of Representatives as a Democrat from 1976 to 1998.

References

Living people
Democratic Party members of the Kentucky House of Representatives
1943 births